Monumen Yogya Kembali (Monument to the Recapture of Yogyakarta), known colloquially as Monjali, is a pyramid-shaped museum dedicated to the Indonesian National Revolution located in the Ngaglik sub-district, Sleman, Special Region of Yogyakarta, Indonesia.

Exhibits include 10 dioramas of key moments in the revolution, artifacts left over from the colonial period and revolution, a list of 420 revolutionaries who were killed between 19 December 1948 and 29 June 1949, as well as a silent memorial room.

Monumen Yogya Kembali is served by Trans Jogja bus stations Monjali 1 and Monjali 2, for line 2A, 2B, 5A, and 5B.

See also
 List of museums and cultural institutions in Indonesia

Notes

External links
 http://www.yogyes.com/en/yogyakarta-tourism-object/museum-and-monument/monjali/

Monuments and memorials in Indonesia
Museums in Yogyakarta
History museums in Indonesia
Sleman Regency